Salim Abd an-Nur, a Lebanese Greek Catholic politician. He graduated from the Jesuit School in Beirut, after which he pursued a business career. His political life began in 1959, when he successfully ran for parliament in the by-poll in Chouf District after the killing on the incumbent parliamentarian Na'im Mghabghab. He was re-elected in 1960 as a Progressive Socialist Party candidate, but was defeated in 1964 and 1968. He managed to retake his seat in the 1972 elections.

References

Progressive Socialist Party politicians
Lebanese Melkite Greek Catholics
Members of the Parliament of Lebanon